Heinz Isler (born 19 February 1960) is a Swiss former cyclist. He competed at the 1980 Summer Olympics and the 1984 Summer Olympics.

References

External links
 

1960 births
Living people
Swiss male cyclists
Olympic cyclists of Switzerland
Cyclists at the 1980 Summer Olympics
Cyclists at the 1984 Summer Olympics
Cyclists from Zürich